The Main Directorate of State Security (Главное управление государственной безопасности, ГУГБ, GUGB) was the name of the Soviet 
most important security body within the People's Commissariat of Internal Affairs (NKVD) USSR. At the time of its existence, which was from  July 10, 1934 to February 3, 1941, the GUGB reflected exactly the  Secret Operational Directorate within OGPU under  Council of People's Commissars, which operated within OGPU structure from 1923 to 1931/32.
An intelligence service and secret police from July 1934 to February 1941, it was run under the auspices of the Peoples Commissariat of Internal Affairs (NKVD). Its first head was first deputy of People's Commissar of Internal Affairs (then – Genrikh Yagoda), Commissioner 1st rank of State Security Yakov Agranov.

History 
The Main Directorate of State Security evolved from the Joint State Political Directorate (or OGPU). On February 3, 1941, the Special Sections (or OO) of the GUGB-NKVD (responsible for counter-intelligence in the military) became part of the Army and Navy (RKKA and RKKF, respectively). The GUGB was disbanded as an organization within NKVD USSR. The units that operated in GUGB were reorganized and made the core of the newly made People's Commissariat of State Security or NKGB.

Following the outbreak of World War II, the NKVD and NKGB were reunited, not as GUGB but as totally separate directorates. On July 20, 1941, Army and Airforce counter-intelligence was returned to the NKVD as Directorate of Special Departments under Viktor Abakumov, in January 1942 Navy CI followed. In April 1943, it was again transferred to the Narkomat of Defence and Narkomat of the Navy, becoming SMERSH (from Smert' Shpionam or "Death to Spies"); at the same time, the GUGB was again separated from the NKVD as NKGB.

GUGB heads 
By the end of 1937, the GUGB was the most powerful and influential organ in the NKVD structure. GUGB departments (or Sections)  dealt with - intelligence, internal security, counter-intelligence, protection of government and secret communications. The first chief of the GUGB was Yakov Agranov, Commissioner 1st rank of State Security and first deputy of People's Commissar of Internal Affairs. The next chief of the GUGB from April 15, 1937, to September 8, 1938, was komkor Mikhail Frinovsky, he was succeeded by Lavrenty Beria, then just promoted to Commissioner 1st rank of State Security. When Beria became People's Commissar of Internal Affairs (head of NKVD), Commissioner 3rd rank of State Security Vsevolod Merkulov became his first deputy and the new and final head of GUGB.

Organization 
Between 1934 and 1941, the Main Directorate of State Security went through several organizational changes. In January 1935, there were nine departments in the GUGB structure:

 (head of GUGB)Commissioner 1st rank of State Security  Yakov Agranov
 Operational Department (headed by)   Karl Pauker 
 Special DepartmentGleb Bokii
 Department of Economics – (ЭКО/EKO)Lev Mironov
 Special Department – (OO)Mark Gay
 Secret Political Department – (СПО/SPO)Georgy Molchanov
 Foreign Department – (ИНО/INO)Artur Artuzov
 Department of Transport – (ТО)Vladimir Kichkin
 Department of Information and Statistic – (УСО/USO)Yakov Genkin
 Staff Department – (OK)Yakov Weynschtok

By the end of 1937 the People's Commissar of Internal Affairs Nikolai Yezhov, in his order #00362 had changed the number of departments from five to twelve.

 (head of GUGB)komkor Mikhail Frinovsky
 Department 1 [Protection of Government]Israel Dagin
 Department 2 [Operative]Ans Zalpeter
 Department 3 [counter-intelligence] (КРО/KRO)Aleksandr Minayev-Cikanovich
 Department 4 [Secret Political] (СПО/SPO)Mikhail Litvin
 Department 5 [Special] (OO)Nikolai  Nikolaev-Zhuryd
 Department 6 [Transport] (TO)Mikhail Volkov
 Department 7 [Foreign (Intelligence)] (ИНО/INO) – Abram Slutsky
 Department 8 [Records and Statistic] (УСО/USO)Vladimir Cesarsky
 Department 9 [Special (codes)] (OO)Isaak Shapiro
 Department 10 [Prison]Yakov Weynschtok
 Department 11 [Maritime Transportation] (ВО/WO)Victor Yrcev
 Department 12 [Technical and Operational] (OOT)Semyen Zhukovsky

After Lavrenty Beria took over Frinovsky place as a GUGB head, in 29 of September 1938, GUGB underwent another organizational change -

 (head of GUGB)Commissioner 1st rank of State Security Lavrenty Beria

Department 1 – [Protection of Government]Israel Dagin
Department 2 – [Secret Political]Bogdan Kobulov
Department 3 – [counter-intelligence]Nikolai  Nikolaev-Zhuryd
Department 4 – [Special]  — Pyotr Fedotov
Department 5 – [Foreign (Intelligence)]Zelman Passov
Department 6 – [Codes] Alexander Balamutov
GUGB Investigating Section —

 (head of GUGB)Commissioner 3rd rank of State Security Vsevolod Merkulov

Department 1 – [Protection of Party and Soviet officials]
included Political department, 24 office divisions, a school, commandant's offices of the CC VKP(b) and NKVD of USSR
Department 2 – [Secret Political]
Division 1 [trotskyists, zinovievists, leftists, rightists, miasnikovtsi, shlyapnikovtsi, banned from the party, foreign missions]
Division 2 [Mensheviks, anarchists, members of the Socialist Revolutionary Party, bundists, zionists, clerics, provocateurs, gendarmes, counterintelligence agents, punishers, White Cossacks, monarchists]
Division 3 [combating Ukrainian, Belarusian, and Ugro-Finnish national ]
Division 4 [agent studies on  political parties, dashnaks, Turkic-Tatar-Mongolian national , gruzmeks, mussavatists, nationalists]
Division 5 [literati, press, publishing, theatres, cinema, art]
Division 6 [academies of sciences, science and research institutes, scientific societies]
Division 7 [discovery and study of  formations among studying youth, system of the People's Commissariat of Enlightenment and children of repressed]
Division 8 [People's Commissariat of Healthcare of USSR and RSFSR and its education institutions]
Division 9 [People's Commissariat of Justice, Supreme Court, Prosecutor's Office, People's Commissariat of Social Security and their educational institutions]
Division 10 [combating church and sect ]
Division 11 [physical culture organizations, volunteer societies, clubs, sports publishers]
Division 12 [Special council, militsiya, fire guard, military commissariats, leadership of the reserves]
Department 3 – [counter-intelligence]
Division 1 [Germany, Hungary]
Division 2 [Japan, China]
Division 3 [Great Britain]
Division 4 [France, Italy, Belgium, Switzerland, Spain]
Division 5 [Romania, Greece, Bulgaria, Yugoslavia]
Division 6 [Poland]
Division 7 [Finland, Sweden, Norway, Denmark]
Division 8 [United States and countries of South America]
Division 9 [Turkey, Iran, Afghanistan]
Division 10 [ White movement  elements]
Division 11 [Latvia, Estonia, Lithuania]
Division 12 [People's Commissariat of Foreign Affairs, embassies and consulates]
Division 13 [ ECCI, MOPR]
Division 14 [ Foreign Trade, trade offices]
Division 15 [ Intourist and VOKS]
Diplomat security section
Diplomat security political department
Divisions 16, 17, 18, 19 Diplomat security
Department 4 – [Special]  —
Division 1 [headquarters]
Division 2 [intelligence directorates]
Division 3 [aviation]
Division 4 [technical troops]
Division 5 [motorized detachments]
Division 6 [artillery, cavalry and artillery detachments]
Division 7 [infantry, cavalry and artillery detachments]
Division 8 [ politruk]
Division 9 [medical service]
Division 10 [Navy]
Division 11 [NKVD troops]
Division 12 [organizational and mobilizing]
investigative section
Department 5 – [Foreign (Intelligence)]
Division 1 [Germany, Hungary, Denmark]
Division 2 [Poland]
Division 3 [France, Belgium, Switzerland, Netherlands]
Division 4 [Great Britain]
Division 5 [Italy]
Division 6 [Spain]
Division 7 [Romania, Bulgaria, Yugoslavia, Greece]
Division 8 [Finland, Sweden, Norway, Spitzbergen]
Division 9 [Latvia, Estonia, Lithuania]
Division 10 [United States, Canada, South America, Mexico]
Division 11 [Japan, Manchuria]
Division 12 [China, Xinjiang]
Division 12 [Mongolia, Tuva]
Division 12 [Turkey, Iran, Afghanistan]
Division 12 [technical intelligence]
Division 12 [operational equipment]
Division 12 [visas]
Department 6 – [Ciphering, safeguard of state secrecy]
Division 1, 2, 3 [safeguard of state secrecy, verification and recordkeeping of those admitted to secret work and documents]
Division 4 [deciphering]
Division 5 [research, development and recordkeeping of ciphers, drafting NKVD ciphers, preparation of ciphering specialists]
Division 6 [NKVD encrypting process]
Division 7 [organizational management of peripherals, development of instructions and regulations on secret ciphering and agent missions]
Division 8 [ciphering]
GUGB Investigating Section —

GUGB Ranks 
The GUGB had a unique system of ranks, a blend of the position-rank system used in the Red Army and personal ranks used in the Militsiya; the rank insignia was also very distinct. Even though insignia introduced in 1937 followed the Red Army collar patch patterns, it assigned them to very different ranks for GUGB and Internal Troops/political/specialist branches, with GUGB rank placed at least one grade higher than a similar army equivalent.

When GUGB and Militsiya ranks were replaced with military ranks and insignia in February 1943, Major to Sergeant ranks were aligned with Colonel to Junior Lieutenant, and Senior Major and up were replaced with various degrees of Commissioner. In 1945, General Commissioner Lavrentiy Beria received the rank of the Marshal of the Soviet Union, and other GUGB Commissioners received ranks from Generals of the Army to Major General.

Ranks of GUGB 1935–1943
генеральный комиссар ГБCommissioner General of State Security
комиссар ГБ 1-го рангаCommissioner 1st rank of State Security
комиссар ГБ 2-го рангаCommissioner 2nd rank of State Security
комиссар ГБ 3-го рангаCommissioner 3rd rank of State Security
старший майор ГБSenior Major of State Security
майор ГБMajor of State Security
капитан ГБCaptain of State Security
старший лейтенант ГБSenior Lieutenant of State Security
лейтенант ГБLieutenant of State Security
младший лейтенант ГБJunior Lieutenant of State Security
сержант ГБ Sergeant of State Security

Rank insignia 1935-1937

Rank insignia 1937-1943

See also 
 
 Chronology of Soviet secret police agencies
 Eastern Bloc politics

References 

 Piotr Kołakowski - NKWD i GRU na ziemiach Polskich 1939-1945 - (Kulisy wywiadu i kontrwywiadu) - Dom Wydawniczy Bellona Warszawa 2002 - (NKVD and GRU on Polish soil 1939-1945 [Intelligence counter-intelligence series] Warsaw, 2002)

Law enforcement agencies of the Soviet Union
Soviet intelligence agencies
NKVD
Defunct intelligence agencies
Defunct law enforcement agencies of Russia
Russian intelligence agencies
Secret police
1934 establishments in Russia
1934 establishments in the Soviet Union
1943 disestablishments in the Soviet Union
Government agencies established in 1934
Government agencies disestablished in 1943